Pari Telang (born 12 February 1987) is an Indian actress and voice artist who worked in several Marathi as well as  Hindi films, television and theatres. She known for her portrayal in Star Pravah's Lakshya as Sub-inspector Disha Suryawanshi. She also played child role. She has worked in  Morya and Guldasta.

Career
She started her worked as a child actor, Her first major role was in Zee Marathi's first soap Abhalmaya as Anushka Joshi.

She also acted in comedy TV show Fu Bai Fu on Zee Marathi. She plays the role of a police inspector Disha Suryawanshi in Star Pravah's TV serial Lakshya. She also work as comedian in Marathi serial Comedy Express which held by ETV Marathi.

Along with being a great actress, she is a great dubbing artist as well, having worked with a number of Disney Serials as well as for Harry Potter films. Hosting and Anchoring is one of her other skill set.

Personal life 

Pari Telang's father is Bhushan Telang, who is also an actor in Marathi film Industry.
She was born and brought up in Mumbai and her education was completed at Ramnarain Ruia College in Mumbai.
 
In 2020, she married her beau Siddhesh Shirgaonkar in Mumbai

Filmography

Films

Television

References

External links
 Pari Telang at IMDb

Living people
Actresses in Marathi television
1987 births